Sydney Sido Siame (born 7 October 1997) is a Zambian sprinter. He competed in the 200 metres at the 2015 World Championships in Beijing without advancing from the first round. In addition, he won a gold medal at the 2014 Summer Youth Olympics.

A run of 9.88 seconds was recorded for the 100 m in Lusaka in 2017, but Siame's time was excluded from the global lists on the basis of doubtful timing. This would have been the first time a Zambian had broken the 10-second barrier and a highly unusual improvement of 0.34 seconds for the athlete.

Competition record

1Disqualified in the semifinals

2Disqualified in the final

Personal bests
Outdoor
100 metres – 10.06 (+1.1 m/s, Šamorín 2018)
200 metres – 20.16 (+1.5 m/s, La Chaux-de-Fonds 2019)

References

External links
 

 

1997 births
Living people
People from Isoka District
Zambian male sprinters
World Athletics Championships athletes for Zambia
Athletes (track and field) at the 2014 Summer Youth Olympics
Athletes (track and field) at the 2015 African Games
Commonwealth Games competitors for Zambia
Athletes (track and field) at the 2018 Commonwealth Games
Athletes (track and field) at the 2019 African Games
African Games gold medalists in athletics (track and field)
African Games gold medalists for Zambia
Youth Olympic gold medalists for Zambia
Youth Olympic gold medalists in athletics (track and field)
Athletes (track and field) at the 2020 Summer Olympics
Olympic athletes of Zambia